The 2011–12 Sam Houston State Bearkats men's basketball team represented Sam Houston State University in the 2011–12 college basketball season. This was head coach Jason Hooten's second season at Sam Houston. The Bearkats played their home games at the Bernard Johnson Coliseum and are members of West Division of the Southland Conference. They finished the season 13–19, 7–9 in Southland play to finish in fourth place in the West Division. They lost in the quarterfinals of the Southland Basketball tournament to their rival Stephen F. Austin.

Roster

Media
All Bearkats basketball games are broadcast by KSAM 101.7 FM. All Bearkats home games are televised by the Bearkats Sports Network and are streamed online through gobearkats.com.

Schedule and results
Source

|-
!colspan=9 style=|Regular season

|-
!colspan=9 style=| Southland tournament

References

Sam Houston Bearkats men's basketball seasons
Sam Houston State
Sam Houston State Bearkats basketball
Sam Houston State Bearkats basketball